is a train station in Adachi, Tokyo, Japan.

Lines 

Tokyo Metropolitan Bureau of Transportation
Nippori-Toneri Liner

Platforms 
This elevated station consists of a single island platform serving two tracks.

History 
The station opened on 30 March 2008, when the Nippori-Toneri Liner began operation.

Station numbering was introduced in November 2017 with the station receiving station number NT09.

References

External links
 Toei Nishiaraidaishi-nishi Station 

Railway stations in Tokyo
Railway stations in Japan opened in 2008
Nippori-Toneri Liner